Mary DeGenaro (born April 25, 1961) is a former associate justice of the Supreme Court of Ohio.

Biography

DeGenaro received her Bachelor of Arts degree from Youngstown State University in 1983 and her Juris Doctor from the Cleveland-Marshall College of Law in 1986.

After graduation from law school, she served as a law clerk to Judge George Washington White of the United States District Court for the Northern District of Ohio.

She served 14 years in private practice before her election to the bench. During her judicial service, she also served as an adjunct faculty member for the political science department at Youngstown State University.

State court service
DeGenaro served as a judge from 2001 to 2018 on the Seventh District Court of Appeals in Youngstown. She was sworn in on February 9, 2001.

Supreme Court of Ohio service
On January 25, 2018, Governor John Kasich announced his appointment of DeGenaro to fill the seat vacated by the retirement of William O'Neill. She was sworn in as Ohio's 159th Justice on January 28, 2018. At the time of her appointment, it made the composition of the court all Republican jurists and majority female.

On November 8, 2018, DeGenaro faced Melody J. Stewart in the general election for a seat on the Supreme Court. Stewart won the seat 52.5% to 47.5%.

Recognition and memberships
She served as vice president of the Ohio Women's Bar Association at the time of her Supreme Court appointment.

In 2005, she began serving as a founding member of the Ohio State Bar Association's Appellate Practice Specialty Certification Board, which administers the specialty bar examination and certification.

References

External links
Official Biography on Ohio Supreme Court website

1961 births
Living people
Cleveland–Marshall College of Law alumni
Lawyers from Cleveland
Ohio Republicans
Ohio state court judges
Justices of the Ohio Supreme Court
Youngstown State University alumni
20th-century American lawyers
21st-century American judges
20th-century American judges
20th-century American women lawyers
20th-century American women judges
21st-century American women judges